is a railway station in Ōita City, Ōita Prefecture, Japan. It is operated by JR Kyushu and is on the Hōhi Main Line.

Lines

Layout 
The station consists of a side platform serving a single track. There is no station building, but a shelter is provided on the platform together with a staffed ticket booth, an automatic ticket vending machine, a SUGOCA card charging station and a SUGOCA card reader.

Management of the station has been outsourced to the JR Kyushu Tetsudou Eigyou Co., a wholly owned subsidiary of JR Kyushu specialising in station services. It staffs the ticket booth which is equipped with a POS machine but does not have a Midori no Madoguchi facility.

Adjacent stations

History
Japanese National Railways (JNR) opened the station on 22 February 1987 as an additional station on the existing track of the Hōhi Main Line. With the privatization of JNR on 1 April 1987, the station came under the control of JR Kyushu.

In February 2018, JR Kyushu announced that the station would become unstaffed in the autumn of 2018 after completing barrier-free improvements and introducing the "Smart Support" remote station management scheme.

Passenger statistics
In fiscal 2016, the station was used by an average of 1,166 passengers daily (boarding passengers only), and it ranked 146th among the busiest stations of JR Kyushu.

In popular culture

The American YouTuber based in Japan, Kevin O'Donnell, referenced Shikido Station in his skit "Trains in Tokyo vs. Trains everywhere else" as a 無人駅 or staff-less station.

See also
List of railway stations in Japan

References

External links
Shikado (JR Kyushu)

Railway stations in Ōita Prefecture
Railway stations in Japan opened in 1987
Ōita (city)